The New Zealand Inline Hockey National Championships is the biggest Inline Hockey Club Championship in New Zealand.

Teams

Auckland Orcas
Capital Penguins
Christchurch Snipers
Glenfield Blackhawks
Hamilton Devils
Hutt City Hawks
Kapiti Coast
Levin Thunder
Manawatu Dragons
Manukau Storm
Massey Titans.
Morrinsville Piako Pirates
Mt. Mustangs
Mt. Wellington Panthers
Napier Sharks
Nelson Whalers
New Plymouth Ravens
Northland Stingrays
Rimutaka Renegades
Sabres
Tauranga Mighty Ducks
Tawa Typhoons
Vipers Inline Hockey
Waihi Miners
Wanganui Lightning

External links

New Zealand Website
Inline Hockey in New Zealand

International
 World Inline Hockey
 FIRS Roller Sports

Roller hockey competitions in New Zealand
New Zealand
Roller Hockey